Full Length LP is the debut album by the Huntington Beach, California punk rock band Guttermouth, released in 1991 by Dr. Strange Records. It introduced the band's style of fast, abrasive punk rock with tongue-in-cheek humor and sarcastic lyrics. The album was originally released as an LP but was repackaged the following year as a CD including tracks from the band's first 2 EPs Puke and Balls, as well as the previously unreleased tracks "Malted Vomit" and "Ghost." It was re-released again in 1996 by Nitro Records under the title The Album Formerly Known as Full Length LP.

The album proved to be a success for the band, expanding their fan base and giving them opportunities to play shows all over southern California alongside other popular punk rock bands. An animated music video was made for the song “1, 2, 3…Slam!” and played on local punk rock and skateboarding video programs. Many of the songs from Full Length would remain staples in the band's live set throughout their career.

Track listing
All songs written by Guttermouth except where noted
"Race Track"
"No More"
"Jack La Lanne"
"Where Was I?"
"Old Glory"
"I'm Punk"
"Mr. Barbeque"
"Bruce Lee vs. the Kiss Army"
"Chicken Box"
"Carp"
"Toilet"
"Oats"
"1, 2, 3...Slam!"
"I Used to be 20" (written & originally performed by the Dayglo Abortions as "I Used to be in Love")
"Reggae Man"
"Chicken Box" (again)*
"Just a Fuck"*
"Hypocrite"*
"Marco-Polo"*
"Under My Skin"*
"Gas Out"*
"No Such Thing"*
"Malted Vomit"*
"Ghost"*

*Tracks 16-24 are included on CD re-releases only. Tracks 16-22 comprise the band's first 2 EPs Puke and Balls, while tracks 23 & 24 are previously unreleased. "Chicken Box (again)" is not included on the 1996 re-release.

Personnel
Mark Adkins - vocals
Scott Sheldon - guitar
Eric "Derek" Davis - guitar
Clint "Cliff" Weinrich - bass
James Nunn - drums

Album information
Record label:
original LP & CD releases: Dr. Strange Records
1996 re-release: Nitro Records
Recorded April 27–28 and June 22–23, 1990 at Westbeach Recorders by Donnell Cameron with assistance by Joe Peccorillo
Produced by Guttermouth
All songs written by Guttermouth except "I Used to be 20" by the Dayglow Abortions
1996 re-release remastered by Eddie Shreyer at Futuredisc
Photos on 1996 re-release by Paul Cobb

Guttermouth albums
Dr. Strange Records albums
Nitro Records albums
1991 debut albums